Adhey Kangal or Athey Kangal may refer to:

Athey Kangal (1967 film)
Adhe Kangal (2017 film)
Adhey Kangal (TV series)